is a passenger railway station in the city of Naka, Ibaraki, Japan operated by East Japan Railway Company (JR East).

Lines
Shimo-Sugaya Station is served by the Suigun Line, and is located 7.8 rail kilometers from the official starting point of the line at Mito Station.

Station layout
The station consists of two unnumbered opposed side platforms connected to the station building by a footbridge. The station is unattended.

Platforms

History
Shimo-Sugaya Station opened on November 16, 1896 as a station on the Ota Railway. The Ota Railway merged with the Mito Railway on October 21, 1901 and was nationalized on December 1, 1927. The station was absorbed into the JR East network upon the privatization of the Japanese National Railways (JNR) on April 1, 1987.

Surrounding area

See also
List of railway stations in Japan

External links

  JR East Station information 

Railway stations in Ibaraki Prefecture
Suigun Line
Railway stations in Japan opened in 1897
Naka, Ibaraki